"Preach" is a song by English recording trio M.O. Co-written by Joel Compass and Starsmith. It was released as a digital download on 24 April 2015 in the United Kingdom, marking the band's third regular single. It reached number 51 on the UK Singles Chart.

Music video
A music video for "Preach" was directed by Kate Moross and released online on 27 March 2015.

Track listing

Charts

Release history

References

External links
 
 Lyrics of this song - Preach

2015 singles
2015 songs
M.O songs
Song recordings produced by Starsmith
Songs written by Starsmith